Mubarak Al Mansoori (Arabic:مبارك المنصوري) (born 22 November 1991) is an Emirati footballer who plays as a left back, most recently for Al-Hamriyah.

Career

Al-Wahda
Al Mansoori started his career at Al-Wahda and is a product of the Al-Wahda's youth system. On 23 January 2012, Al Mansoori made his professional debut for Al-Wahda against Al-Shabab in the Pro League, replacing Haider Alo Ali.

Al-Wasl
On 16 July 2015, left Al-Wahda and signed with Al-Wasl.

Al-Shaab
On 19 September 2015, left Al-Wasl and signed with Al-Shaab.

Baniyas
On 10 August 2016, left Al-Shaab and signed with Baniyas. On 27 January 2017, Al Mansoori made his professional debut for Baniyas against Al-Shabab in the Pro League. landed with Baniyas from the UAE Pro League to the UAE First Division League in 2016-17 season. ended up with Baniyas from the UAE First Division League to the UAE Pro League in the 2017-18 season.

Al-Hamriyah
On 16 July 2019, left Baniyas and signed with Al-Hamriyah.

References

External links
 

1991 births
Living people
Emirati footballers
Al Wahda FC players
Al-Wasl F.C. players
Al-Shaab CSC players
Baniyas Club players
Al Hamriyah Club players
UAE Pro League players
UAE First Division League players
Association football fullbacks
Place of birth missing (living people)